Guney may refer to:
Güney, Turkey
Guney-ye Gharbi Rural District
Guney-ye Markazi Rural District
Guney-ye Sharqi Rural District